RIBA Competitions is the Royal Institute of British Architects' unit dedicated to organising architectural and other design-related competitions.

Architectural design competitions are used by an organisation that plans to build a new building or refurbish an existing building.  They can be used for buildings, engineering work, structures, landscape design projects or public realm artworks.  A competition typically asks for architects and/or designers to submit a design proposal in response to a given brief.  The winning design will then be selected by an independent jury panel of design professionals and client representatives.  The independence of the jury is vital to the fair conduct of a competition.

The objective of a competition is to explore a range of different design options to select the best response to the design brief, which would not be possible by pre-selecting one architect.

The competitions process is often used to generate new ideas, create blue-sky thinking, stimulate debate, raise the profile of the project and allow an opportunity for emerging talent to grow as well as established design practices.

History
In 1871 the RIBA appointed a special committee to draw up the first set of model rules and regulations for competitions.  A Competitions Committee was set up in 1883 to monitor competitions and a revised version of the rules and regulations was published at this time.

In 1967 the RIBA set up a Competitions Working Group who decided not just to monitor competitions but actively promote them and persuade clients to use them. From 1971 onwards a permanent Competitions Office was established at the RIBA.

RIBA Competitions is the only organisation in the UK who has maintained a steady flow of competitions as part of the normal working environment and to have studied the competition system in depth.

Project list
RIBA Competitions has been responsible for delivering some of the most high-profile building projects in the UK and abroad through competition, such as:

Civic and Commercial
 Bourne Hill Council Offices, Salisbury
 Cleopatra's Kiosk
 Gateway Plus (previously known as "Birmingham Gateway")
 Manchester Civil Justice Centre
 RIBA Bar
 Senedd (also known as "National Assembly for Wales")
 Toyota (GB) Ltd Headquarters
 New Islington Footbridge
  76 Portland Place

Culture, sport and leisure
 Avenham Park Pavilion
 Baltic Centre for Contemporary Art
 Banbury Museum
 Brockholes Nature Reserve Visitor Centre
 Courtyard, Hereford
 London Velopark (also known as London 2012 Velodrome)
 Maidstone Museum - East Wing extension
 Manchester Art Gallery
 National Centre for Popular Music (now known as Sheffield Hallam University students' union)
 National Maritime Museum Cornwall
 National Waterfront Museum
 Newlyn Art Gallery
 The Collection Lincoln
 The Hepworth Wakefield
 The MAC Belfast
 The Sage Gateshead
 The Whitworth Art Gallery, Manchester
 The Novium Museum
 The Wilson Art Gallery & Museum
 The Leventis Gallery

Education, health and the community
 Campuses of the University of Nottingham Jubilee Campus, University of Nottingham
 Corpus Christi College Auditorium
 Evelina Children's Hospital
 James Allen's Community Music School
 St Thomas' Hospital re-cladding
 Kentish Town Health Centre
 London School of Economics, Saw Swee Hock Student Centre
 City and Islington College
 Bishop Edward King Chapel

Housing and regeneration
 Clayfield Affordable Homes
 Redevelopment of JCB's Heavy Products site
 Timber Wharf

Public realm, artworks and structures
 Halley Research Station
 Infinity Bridge
 Kielder Observatory
 Millennium Bridge (London)
 Pylon Design Competition
 The Halo, Rossendale
 The Royal Parks Foundation - Drinking Fountains
 BBC Listening Project
 RIBA Lounge MIPIMUK 2014
 Grand Designs Live 2015

References 

Architectural competitions
Architectural design
Royal Institute of British Architects